The Vanderbilt Hustler is the main student newspaper at Vanderbilt University in Nashville, Tennessee. It is the oldest newspaper in Tennessee.

History
The newspaper was started in 1888, making it the oldest newspaper publication in the state of Tennessee.

In the 1960s, Lamar Alexander served as its editor, and called for open admission of African Americans on campus. More recently, Willie Geist was the editor.

In 2020, the Vanderbilt Hustler first reported that Sarah Fuller practiced with the Vanderbilt football program. Fuller became the first woman to play in a Power Five football game.

Past issues
Past issues, going back to 2006, can be read online. There is also an old issue from September 24, 1891. Additionally, past issues dating back to August 2010 can also be read online on Issuu.

References

External links 

1888 establishments in Tennessee
Publications established in 1888
Student newspapers published in Tennessee
Vanderbilt University